Balitora is a genus of fish in the family Balitoridae endemic to Asia.

Species
There are currently 20 recognized species in this genus:
 Balitora annamitica Kottelat, 1988
 Balitora brucei J. E. Gray, 1830 (Gray's stone loach)
 Balitora burmanica Hora, 1932 (Burmese stone loach)
 Balitora chipkali Kumkar, U. Katwate, Raghavan & Dahanukar, 2016 (Chipkali stone loach) 
 Balitora eddsi Conway & Mayden, 2010
 Balitora jalpalli Raghavan, Tharian, Ali, Jadhav & Dahanukar, 2013 
 Balitora kwangsiensis (P. W. Fang, 1930)
 Balitora lancangjiangensis (C. Y. Zheng, 1980)
 Balitora laticauda Bhoite, Jadhav & Dahanukar, 2012 
 Balitora longibarbata (Y. R. Chen, 1982)
 Balitora ludongensis S. W. Liu & X. Y. Chen, 2012 
 Balitora meridionalis Kottelat, 1988
 Balitora mysorensis Hora, 1941 (Slender stone loach)
 Balitora nantingensis X. Y. Chen, G. H. Cui & J. X. Yang, 2005 (species inquirenda in Balitora)
Balitora nigrocorpa  Nguyen, 2005
Balitora nujiangensis Zhang & Zheng, 1983
Balitora tchangi Zheng, 1982
Balitora vanlani Nguyen, 2005 
Balitora vanlongi Nguyen, 2005

References

 
Balitoridae
Fish of Asia
Taxa named by John Edward Gray